Georgina Dempsey (born 29 July 2004) is an Irish cricketer who plays for Typhoons and Ireland. In May 2021, Dempsey was named in Ireland's squad to face Scotland, for a four-match Women's Twenty20 International (WT20I) series in Belfast. She made her WT20I debut on 27 May 2021, for Ireland against Scotland. In August 2021, while playing for Phoenix Cricket Club, she scored 139 not out from 68 deliveries, the highest individual score in Ireland Women's Senior T20 cricket.

In September 2021, Dempsey was named in Ireland's Women's One Day International (WODI) squad for their series against Zimbabwe, the first WODI matches to be played by the Zimbabwe team. She made her WODI debut on 5 October 2021, for Ireland against Zimbabwe. In November 2021, she was named in Ireland's team for the 2021 Women's Cricket World Cup Qualifier tournament in Zimbabwe.

References

External links

2004 births
Living people
Irish women cricketers
Ireland women One Day International cricketers
Ireland women Twenty20 International cricketers
Place of birth missing (living people)
Typhoons (women's cricket) cricketers